Clepsis insignata is a species of moth of the family Tortricidae. It is found in Hokkaido, Japan.

The wingspan is about 15 mm. The forewings are whitish-grey to light grey. The posterior area is reticulated with dark brownish-grey. There are dark brownish-grey markings, mixed with ochreous-brown scales.

References

Moths described in 1963
Clepsis